Rosalind Venetia Lane Fox Pitt-Rivers FRS (
Henley; 4 March 1907 – 14 January 1990) was a British biochemist. She became the second president of the European Thyroid Association in 1971; she succeeded Jean Roche and was followed by Jack Gross in this position, all three names inextricably linked with the discovery of the thyroid hormone triiodothyronine (T3).

Early life and education
Pitt-Rivers was born Rosalind Venetia Henley on 4 March 1907 at 18 Mansfield Street, London, the eldest of four daughters of the Hon. Anthony Morton Henley (1873–1925), a Captain in the 5th Lancers, and his wife the Hon. Sylvia Laura Stanley (1882–1980). Her father was the third son of Anthony Henley, 3rd Baron Henley and her mother the daughter of Lord Stanley of Alderley.

She was educated at home and later at Notting Hill High School at the age of thirteen.  Her interest in chemistry began at the age of twelve when an uncle gave her a chemistry set. She later studied at Bedford College (University of London), where she was awarded a Bachelor of Science in 1930 with first class honours, and an MSc in 1931.

Personal life
In 1931, she married, as his second wife, George Pitt-Rivers (1890–1966), anthropologist and eugenist, one of the richest men in England, and a grandson of Augustus Pitt Rivers (1827–1900), who founded the anthropology museum named after him in Oxford. She became stepmother to the two boys from his first marriage, Michael and Julian. She gave birth to a son, Anthony Pitt-Rivers, in 1932, but the marriage was dissolved in 1937. 

During their marriage, her husband had become increasingly pro-eugenics and antisemitic, drawing closer to German eugenicists and praising Mussolini and Hitler; by 1940 he was interned under Defence Regulation 18B.

Career
After she separated from Pitt-Rivers in 1937, she returned to study and gained a PhD in Biochemistry from University College medical school in 1939.

She joined the scientific staff of the National Institute for Medical Research (NIMR) in Mill Hill London in 1942, the largest institute of the UK Medical Research Council (MRC). She later became head of the Division of Chemistry, and retired in 1972.

After working with Jack Gross on the discovery of the T3 hormone and publishing their findings in The Lancet in 1952, she gained international recognition. She was elected a Fellow of the Royal Society (FRS) in 1954. In 1973 she was made a fellow of Bedford College, London, in 1983 an honorary fellow of the Royal Society of Medicine, and in 1986 an honorary fellow of the Royal College of Physicians.

Her publications with Jamshed Tata include The Thyroid Hormones (1959); The Chemistry of Thyroid Diseases (1960); and (with W. R. Trotter) The Thyroid Gland (1964).

References 

 

1907 births
1990 deaths
Female Fellows of the Royal Society
Fellows of the Royal College of Physicians
British biochemists
Women biochemists
People educated at Notting Hill & Ealing High School
Alumni of Bedford College, London
National Institute for Medical Research faculty
Fellows of the Royal Society
20th-century British women scientists